Rhetorical structure theory (RST) is a theory of text organization that describes relations that hold between parts of text. It was originally developed by William Mann, Sandra Thompson, Christian M.I.M. Matthiessen and others at the University of Southern California's Information Sciences Institute (ISI) and defined in a 1988 paper. The theory was developed as part of studies of computer-based text generation. Natural language researchers later began using RST in text summarization and other applications. It explains coherence by postulating a hierarchical, connected structure of texts.  In 2000, Daniel Marcu, also of ISI, demonstrated that practical discourse parsing and text summarization also could be achieved using RST.

Rhetorical relations
Rhetorical relations or coherence relations or discourse relations are paratactic (coordinate) or hypotactic (subordinate) relations that hold across two or more text spans. It is widely accepted that notion of coherence is through text relations like this. RST using rhetorical relations provide a systematic way for an analyst to analyse the text. An analysis is usually built by reading the text and constructing a tree using the relations. The following example is a title and
summary, appearing at the top of an article in Scientific American magazine (Ramachandran and Anstis, 1986). The original text, broken into numbered units, is:

 [Title:] The Perception of Apparent Motion
 [Abstract:] When the motion of an intermittently seen object is ambiguous 
 the visual system resolves confusion
 by applying some tricks that reflect a built-in knowledge of properties of the physical world

In the figure, numbers 1,2,3,4 show the corresponding units as explained above.
The fourth unit and the third unit form a relation "Means". The third unit is the essential part of this relation, so it is called the nucleus of the relation and fourth unit is called the satellite of the relation. Similarly second unit to third and fourth unit is forming relation "Condition". All units are also spans and spans may be composed of more than one unit.

Nuclearity in discourse
RST establishes two different types of units. Nuclei are considered as the most important parts of text whereas satellites contribute to the nuclei and are secondary. 
Nucleus contains basic information and satellite contains additional information about nucleus. The satellite is often incomprehensible without nucleus, whereas a text where a satellites have been deleted can be understood to a certain extent.

Hierarchy in the analysis
RST relations are applied recursively in a text, until all units in that text are constituents in an RST relation. The result of such analyses is that RST structure are typically represented as trees, with one top level relation that encompasses other relations at lower levels.

Why RST?
 From linguistic point of view, RST proposes a different view of text organization than most linguistic theories.
 RST points to a tight relation between relations and coherence in text
 From a computational point of view, it provides a characterization of text relations that has been implemented in different systems and for applications as text generation and summarization.

In design rationale
Computer scientists Ana Cristina Bicharra Garcia and Clarisse Sieckenius de Souz have used RST as the basis of a design rationale system called ADD+. In ADD+, RST is used as the basis for the rhetorical organization of a knowledge base, in a way comparable to other knowledge representation systems such as issue-based information system (IBIS). Similarly, RST has been used in representation schemes for argumentation.

See also
 Argument mining
 Parse tree

References

Argument technology
Discourse analysis
Knowledge representation
Natural language processing